There are two species of snake named Cope's black-striped snake:
 Coniophanes piceivittis
 Coniophanes taeniata